The Second Time Around is a 1961 American CinemaScope Comedy Western film starring Debbie Reynolds as a widow who relocates her family from 1911 or 1912 New York to the Arizona Territory. It is based on the novel Star in the West by Richard Emery Roberts.

The film co-stars Andy Griffith and Steve Forrest. It was directed by Vincent Sherman.

Plot
Lu Rogers, recently widowed, leaves her children in New York with her mother-in-law in 1911 and travels west to take a job she has been offered. Upon arriving in Arizona, the job falls through, so rancher Aggie Gates tries her out as a hired hand.

The resourceful Lu succeeds at work and catches the eye of two potential suitors, Dan Jones, a saloon owner, and Pat Collins, a rancher. A crooked sheriff is exposed by Lu, who is shocked by being offered his job. The humiliated sheriff pulls a holdup and kidnaps her.

A posse is formed and comes to Lu's rescue. She receives reward money and uses it to send for her kids. Dan wins her hand, while Pat accepts her badge.

Cast
 Debbie Reynolds as Lucretia Rogers
 Steve Forrest as Dan Jones
 Andy Griffith as Pat Collins
 Juliet Prowse as Rena Mitchell
 Thelma Ritter as Aggie Gates
 Ken Scott as Sheriff Burns
 Isobel Elsom as Mrs. Rogers
 Rudolph Acosta as Rodriguez
 Timothy Carey as Bonner
 Tom Greenway as Deputy Shack
 Eleanor Audley as Mrs. Trask
 Blossom Rock as Mrs. Vera Collins
 Jack Orrison as Editor

Reception
Bosley Crowther, critic for The New York Times, wrote, "Don't look for quality in it. Just go there expecting nothing more than another chance to watch Miss Reynolds fluff her fine little feathers prettily, Miss Ritter play the hard-boiled softie, Andy Griffith chew the fat bucolically and Mr. Forrest act the noble scapegrace, and you may have a pretty good time."

Emanuel Levy described it as a "mildly engaging Western comedy".

References

External links
 
 
 
 
 

1961 films
Films based on American novels
Films based on Western (genre) novels
Films directed by Vincent Sherman
Films set in Arizona
Films set in the 1910s
20th Century Fox films
1961 romantic comedy films
1960s Western (genre) comedy films
American romantic comedy films
American Western (genre) comedy films
Films scored by Gerald Fried
1960s English-language films
1960s American films